Greece participated in the Eurovision Song Contest 2017 with the song "This Is Love" written by Dimitris Kontopoulos, Romy Papadea and John Ballard. The song was performed by Demy, who was internally selected by the Greek broadcaster Hellenic Broadcasting Corporation (ERT) to represent Greece at the 2017 contest in Kyiv, Ukraine. Demy was announced at the Greek representative on 13 January 2017, while a national final was held in order to select the song she would perform. Three songs competed in the national final on 6 March 2017 and a combination of international jury voting and public voting selected "This Is Love" as the winning song.

Greece was drawn to compete in the first semi-final of the Eurovision Song Contest, which took place on 9 May 2017. Performing 10th during the show, "This Is Love" was announced among the top 10 entries of the first semi-final and therefore qualified to compete in the final on 13 May. It was later revealed that Greece placed tenth out of the 18 participating countries in the semi-final with 115 points. In the final, Greece performed 15th and placed 19th out of the 26 participating countries, scoring 77 points.

Background 

Between 2004 and 2013, the nation achieved nine top ten placements in the final. -entrant Argo with their song "Utopian Land" failed to qualify the nation to the final for the first time ever, marking Greece's worst result at the contest and leading to their absence from the final for the first time since 2000, a contest they did not take part in.

The Greek national broadcaster, Hellenic Broadcasting Corporation (ERT), broadcasts the event within Greece and organises the selection process for the nation's entry. ERT had been in charge of Greece's participation in the contest since their debut in 1974 until 2013 when the broadcaster was shutdown by a government directive and replaced firstly with the interim  (DT) and then later by the New Hellenic Radio, Internet and Television (NERIT) broadcaster. Following the victory of the  party at the January 2015 Greek legislative election, the Hellenic Parliament re-instated ERT as the public Greek broadcaster by the renaming of NERIT as ERT, which began broadcasting in June 2015. ERT confirmed their intentions to participate at the 2017 Eurovision Song Contest on 7 October 2016. The Greek broadcaster has used various methods to select the Greek entry in the past, such as internal selections and televised national finals to choose the performer, song or both to compete at Eurovision. For the first time since 2009, ERT opted to internally select their entrant with the song determined through a public process.

Before Eurovision

Artist selection 

On 5 January 2017, news website NewsIt reported that the Hellenic Broadcasting Corporation (ERT) had asked both Demy and Stereo Soul to submit songs for consideration to represent the nation at the Eurovision Song Contest 2017. Previously the broadcaster had said that they would select the entry internally, however they reconsidered, seeing Ellinikós Telikós, the Greek selection event, as a revenue source. Demy was subsequently announced as the Greek representative on 13 January 2017, with her song to be selected though a three-song national final.

Ellinikós Telikós 2017 
ERT used the national final Ellinikós Telikós 2017 to select Demy's song for the Eurovision Song Contest 2017. Three songs, all written by Dimitris Kontopoulos, were selected to participate in the national final; their titles were revealed by MAD TV on 28 February 2017. Music videos for the competing songs were filmed in Greece and in Odessa, Ukraine, and were presented during the national final on 6 March 2017.  A demo version and accompanying music video of candidate song "This Is Love" were leaked online on 2 March in the days leading up to the final; however, ERT opted to allow for the national final to continue as planned. The show, held at ERT's studio in Athens and hosted by Elena Bouzala and Antonis Loudaros, was televised on ERT1, ERT HD and ERT World as well as streamed online via the ERT website ert.gr. 

The winning song, "This Is Love", was selected by a combination of public voting (70%) and international jury voting (30%). Public voting was conducted through telephone or SMS, while the international jury consisted of members of Greek diaspora communities from nine European cities. In addition to the presentation of the competing songs, the interval act featured guest performances by 2017 Cypriot Eurovision entrant Hovig and 2017 Moldovan Eurovision entrant SunStroke Project. Former Eurovision contestants Sergey Lazarev, Helena Paparizou, Ani Lorak and Sakis Rouvas also appeared on screen during the event wishing Demy well. The national final received a market share of 7%, which was low compared to previous Greek national finals.

Preparations and promotion 
Following the selection of "This Is Love" as the Greek entry on 6 March 2017, the music video for the song was uploaded to the official Eurovision Song Contest YouTube account, though it was removed shortly after to allow time for a revamped version to be created. The final version of the song and its accompanying music video were revealed on 13 March; the song underwent changes to its instrumentation and lyrics during the chorus. A Greek language version was later created and released in late April 2017 under the name "Oso Zo". Demy did not partake in the annual Eurovision preview shows across Europe, instead performing the song in Greece on ANT1's show Rising Star and at the MAD TV MADWalk fashion show on 21 April. Internationally, Capitol Music Sweden promoted the song throughout Sweden, Norway, Denmark and Finland.

At Eurovision 

The Eurovision Song Contest 2017 took place at the International Exhibition Centre in Kyiv, Ukraine. It consisted of two semi-finals held on 9 and 11 May, respectively, and the final on 13 May 2017. According to Eurovision rules, all nations with the exceptions of the host country and the "Big Five" (France, Germany, Italy, Spain and the United Kingdom) are required to qualify from one of two semi-finals in order to compete for the final; the top ten countries from each semi-final progress to the final. The European Broadcasting Union (EBU) split up the competing countries into six different pots based on voting patterns from previous contests, with countries with favourable voting histories put into the same pot. On 31 January 2017, an allocation draw was held which placed each country into one of the two semi-finals and determined which half of the show they would perform in. Greece was placed into the first semi-final, to be held on 9 May 2017, and was scheduled to perform in the second half of the show.

Once all the competing songs for the 2017 contest had been released, the running order for the semi-finals was decided by the shows' producers rather than through another draw, so that similar songs were not placed next to each other. Greece was set to perform in position 10, following the entry from Portugal and before the entry from Poland. The two semi-finals and the final were televised in Greece on ERT1, ERT HD and ERT World as well as broadcast via radio on ERA 2 and Voice of Greece with commentary by Maria Kozakou and Giorgos Kapoutzidis.

Performances

Demy took part in technical rehearsals on 1 and 4 May, followed by dress rehearsals on 8 and 9 May. This included the jury show on 8 May where the professional juries of each country watched and voted on the competing entries. The Greek performance featured Demy wearing a soft gold dress and performing together on stage with two dancers in nude-coloured shorts playing with water. The stage presentation featured Demy standing on a leveled podium and a hologram screen which appeared in front of the singer during the performance with the LED screens projecting a dark blue background with white and gold raindrops. The performance was choreographed by stage director Fokas Evangelinos. Demy was joined by three off-stage backing vocalists: Erasmia Markidi, Evgenia Liakou and Paris Paraskevadis-Planets. The two dancers that performed with Demy on stage were Iasonas Mandilas and Marcus Giakoumoglou. At the end of the show, Greece was announced as having finished in the top 10 and subsequently qualifying for the final. It was later revealed that Greece placed tenth in the semi-final, receiving a total of 115 points: 54 points from the televoting and 61 points from the juries.

Shortly after the second semi-final, a winners' press conference was held for the ten qualifying countries. As part of this press conference, the qualifying artists took part in a draw to determine which half of the final they would subsequently participate in. Greece was drawn to compete in the second half. Following this draw, the shows' producers decided upon the running order of the final, as they had done for the semi-finals. Greece was subsequently placed to perform in position 15, following the entry from Australia and before the entry from Spain. Demy once again took part in dress rehearsals on 12 and 13 May before the final, including the jury final where the professional juries cast their final votes before the live show. At the 13 May final, Greece placed 19th, scoring 77 points: 29 points from the televoting and 48 points from the juries.

Voting 

Voting during the three shows involved each country awarding two sets of points from 1-8, 10 and 12: one from their professional jury and the other from televoting. Each nation's jury consisted of five music industry professionals who are citizens of the country they represent, with their names published before the contest to ensure transparency. This jury judged each entry based on: vocal capacity; the stage performance; the song's composition and originality; and the overall impression by the act. In addition, no member of a national jury was permitted to be related in any way to any of the competing acts in such a way that they cannot vote impartially and independently. The individual rankings of each jury member as well as the nation's televoting results were released shortly after the final. Greece's jury consisted of Vicky Gerotheodorou (jury chairperson), Xenia Ghali, Akis Anastasiadis and Aris Petrakis. The Greek spokesperson, who announced the top 12-point score awarded by the Greek jury during the final, was Constantinos Christoforou, who previously represented Cyprus at the Eurovision Song Contest as a solo artist in 1996 and 2005 as well as in 2002 as part of the boy band One. Below is a breakdown of points awarded to Greece and awarded by Greece in both the first semi-final and the final of the contest, and the breakdown of the jury voting and televoting conducted during the two shows.

Points awarded to Greece

Points awarded by Greece

Detailed voting results
The following members comprised the Greek jury:
 Vicky Gerotheodorou (jury chairperson)lyricist
 Xenia Ghalicomposer and producer
 radio producer
 Akis Anastasiadismusic producer
 Aris Petrakisperformer

References 

2017
Countries in the Eurovision Song Contest 2017
Eurovision